Bullets, Blunts in ah Big Bankroll is the twelfth album by American rapper Andre Nickatina. It was released on May 18, 2004 for Nickatina's own Nicky I.N.C. label and was produced by Andre Nickatina, Nick Peace, Krushadelic, Equipto, DJ Pause, DJ Luvva J, First Degree the D.E. and Q-York.

Track listing
"Sold Out Show"- 0:45  
"I'm a Junkie"- 2:51 (featuring Equipto)  
"Eye's of a Child"- 2:19 (featuring Equipto) 
"Nasty Like College Chicks"- 2:40  
"Andre-n-Andre"- 3:51 (featuring Mac Dre) 
"Ceasar Enrico"- 3:02  
"Heaven Thru the Backdoor"- 3:21  
"At My Car"- 2:40  
"My Wishes"- 3:11 (featuring Equipto) 
"Blood in My Hair"- 3:47  
"2 T-Shirts n a Adidas Suit"- 3:25  
"1 of the Same"- 3:34  
"Crackin Like Pastachios"- 2:23  
"Bonus"- 1:58

References

2004 albums
Andre Nickatina albums